James Mary Kent (1872 – 1939) was a lawyer, judge and politician in Newfoundland. He represented St. John's East in the Newfoundland House of Assembly from 1904 to 1909 and from 1913 to 1916 as a Liberal.

The son of Robert John Kent and Ellen Donnelly, he was born in St. John's and was educated at St. Patrick's Hall, Clongowes Wood College and the Royal University of Ireland. Kent married Annie Walsh. He studied law with his father and Joseph Ignatius Little and was admitted to the Newfoundland bar around 1893. He practised in partnership with his brother John and then with Martin W. Furlong. Kent served in the Newfoundland cabinet as Minister of Justice and Attorney General. He was defeated when he ran for reelection in 1909. He returned to the practice of law in partnership with Richard T. McGrath. Kent also represented Newfoundland in a fisheries dispute with the United States in 1909. He became Liberal party leader in 1914 after Robert Bond retired. In 1916, he was named to the Supreme Court of Newfoundland. He served as head of the Civil Re-establishment Committee at the end of World War I. He was also vice-president of the Benevolent Irish Society and a charter member of the Knights of Columbus

References 

1872 births
1939 deaths
Liberal Party of Newfoundland and Labrador MHAs
Dominion of Newfoundland judges
Attorneys-General of Newfoundland Colony
Members of the Executive Council of Newfoundland and Labrador
Dominion of Newfoundland politicians